Danny! (aka The Danny Bonaduce Show) is an American syndicated talk show hosted by Danny Bonaduce that ran from 1995 to 1996. The show is notable for its the first episode featuring a majority of his fellow cast members from The Partridge Family as his guests. The show was taped in Chicago.

References

External links
 

1995 American television series debuts
1996 American television series endings
American television talk shows
First-run syndicated television programs in the United States
Television series by Disney–ABC Domestic Television